William Ellwood Heinecke (born 1949) is an American-born Thai businessman. He is the Founder & Chairman of Minor International PCL. Minor International includes Minor Hotels, Minor Food Group and Minor Lifestyle. He is the CEO and Chairman of Minor Corporation, the CEO and Chairman of Minor International, and Chairman of Minor Food Group.

Biography
Heinecke moved to Bangkok in 1963 at the age of 14 with his family, having previously lived in Japan, Hong Kong, and Malaysia. Heinecke's father spent 25 years in the United States military, serving in World War II and the Korean War. When he retired, he joined the foreign service. His mother was an Asia correspondent for Time magazine. Heinecke studied at the International School Bangkok, and persuaded the editor of the now defunct Bangkok World to let him write a weekly column on go-carting. In return, he received advertising space alongside it.

At age 17, while still a high school student, Heinecke took over from the Bangkok World's advertising manager. One year later, he founded Inter-Asian Enterprise, to supply office cleaning services, and Inter-Asian Publicity, a radio advertising company, using US$1,200 he had borrowed. He later sold Inter-Asia Publicity to Ogilvy & Mather. In 1967, he founded Minor Holdings, which over the next four decades would grow into The Minor Group, including more than 30 companies.

Heinecke had his first hotel venture in 1978, the Royal Garden Resort in Pattaya. His business ventures have included advertising agencies and other hotels in Bangkok, Hua Hin, Phuket, Chiang Mai, and Chiang Rai, as well as outside of Thailand. He also introduced American-style fast foods to Thailand in the late 1970s and 1980s – brands like Mister Donut, The Pizza Company, and Burger King. Heinecke naturalized as a Thai citizen in 1991, renouncing United States citizenship in the process. He was the president of the American Chamber of Commerce in Thailand, and sat on the Prime Minister’s Foreign Investment Advisory Council. He is a supporter of the Thai Elephant Conservation Centre, and authored The Entrepreneur, which has been translated into a number of languages.

Minor International

Minor International (MINT) is a global company focused on three core businesses: hospitality, restaurants, and lifestyle brands distribution. MINT is a hotel owner, operator, and investor with a portfolio of 536 hotels under the Anantara, AVANI, Oaks, Tivoli, NH Collection, NH Hotels, nhow, Elewana, and Minor International brands in 55 countries across Asia Pacific, the Middle East, Africa, the Indian Ocean, Europe, and South and North America. MINT is also one of Asia’s largest restaurant companies, with over 2,200 outlets system-wide in 26 countries under The Pizza Company, The Coffee Club, Riverside, Benihana, Thai Express, Bonchon, Swensen’s, Sizzler, Dairy Queen, and Burger King brands. MINT is one of Thailand’s largest distributors of lifestyle brands and contract manufacturers. Its brands include Anello, Bodum, Bossini, Brooks Brothers, Charles & Keith, Esprit, Etam, Joseph Joseph, OVS, Radley, Scomadi, Zwilling J.A. Henckels, and Minor Smart Kids.

In 2017, Minor International bought a 74% stake in London restaurant group Corbin & King. In 2022, it bought the remainder of the group at auction, ousting restaurateur Jeremy King from the group he'd helped found in 1981.

Awards
In 2013, Heinecke received the ABLF Trailblazer Award from the Asian Business Leadership Forum (ABLF) Awards held in Dubai, UAE managed by Indian Expressions. In June 2022, he was  featured on the Global 100 in Hospitality list  by the International Hospitality Institute as one of the 100 Most Powerful People in Global Hospitality.

Philanthropy
Heinecke has been involved in The St. Regis Bangkok Charity Gala & Auction held on an annual basis, contributing to raise funds for nominated organisations under Her Royal Highness Princess Maha Chakri Sirindhorn, the second daughter of King Bhumibol Adulyadej.

References

External links
 Minor Corporation PCL
 Minor Book PCL
 Minor International PCL
 The Pizza Company
Biographical
 Thailand's Big Cheese, by Robert Horn Time magazine - September 25, 2000
 Thailand's Pizza War Thaipro.com 12-Jul-2003
 Dedicated to their work, by Louis Kraar Fortune Magazine - October 1, 1990

1949 births
Living people
American emigrants to Thailand
William Heinecke
William Heinecke
Former United States citizens
William Heinecke
William Heinecke
Minor International